Sir Edward Denny, 3rd Baronet (died 1 August 1831) was an Anglo-Irish politician. His family effectively owned the town of Tralee and had great political influence in Kerry.

Denny was the son of Sir Barry Denny, 1st Baronet and his wife and cousin Jane Denny, and the younger brother of Sir Barry Denny, 2nd Baronet. He was educated at Trinity College, Dublin. 

He held the office of High Sheriff of Kerry in 1794 and was Deputy Lieutenant of County Kerry. On 20 October 1794 he succeeded to his brother's baronetcy, after Sir Barry was killed in a duel with John Gustavus Crosbie. This incident led to a bitter feud between the two families, and the sudden death of Crosbie, after falling from his horse in 1797, led to a local tradition that Edward had arranged for his murder as an act of vengeance. He was elected to the House of Commons of the United Kingdom as a Tory Member of Parliament for Tralee in September 1828, but resigned after less than a year in June 1829 due to poor health. He died two years later.

He married Elizabeth Day, daughter of  Hon. Robert Day, judge of the Court of King's Bench (Ireland)  and his family's former legal adviser, and his first wife Mary (Polly)  Potts, on 26 May 1795, and together they had six children, including Edward, Robert, Diana and Anthony, Archdeacon of Ardfert. He was succeeded by his eldest son, Edward, then on Edward's death without issue to Robert's son.

References

Year of birth uncertain
1731 deaths
People educated at Kilkenny College
Baronets in the Baronetage of Ireland
19th-century Anglo-Irish people
UK MPs 1826–1830
High Sheriffs of Kerry
Members of the Parliament of the United Kingdom for County Kerry constituencies (1801–1922)
Alumni of Trinity College Dublin